The 2020 Vermont Democratic presidential primary took place on March 3, 2020, as one of 15 contests scheduled on Super Tuesday in the Democratic Party primaries for the 2020 presidential election, following the South Carolina primary the weekend before. The Vermont primary was an open primary, with the state awarding 24 delegates towards the 2020 Democratic National Convention, of which 16 were pledged delegates allocated on the basis of the results of the primary.

While Senator Bernie Sanders won the primary in his home state by a landslide, gaining over 50% of the vote and 11 delegates, he underperformed compared to the 2016 primary, when he had won over 85% of the vote, allowing former Vice President Joe Biden to garner 5 delegates with a 22% second-place finish and add to the narrative of his surge following the South Carolina primary. Senator Elizabeth Warren and former New York City mayor Michael Bloomberg placed third and fourth respectively without any delegates.

Procedure
Vermont was one of 14 states and one territory holding primaries on Super Tuesday. The Super Tuesday primary as part of Stage I on the primary timetable received no bonus delegates, in order to disperse the primaries between more different date clusters and keep too many states from hoarding on the first shared date or on a March date in general.

Early voting began on January 18, 2020, and took six days a week between then and election day. Regular voting took place throughout the state from 5:00 a.m. until 7:00 p.m. in much of the state, with some precincts closing as late as 10:00 p.m. In the open primary, candidates had to meet a threshold of 15 percent in order to be considered viable. The 16 pledged delegates to the 2020 Democratic National Convention were allocated proportionally on the basis of the results of the primary. Of these, 11 were formally allocated as district delegates on the basis of the statewide result (by definition coterminous with the state's sole congressional district) and another 2 were allocated to party leaders and elected officials (PLEO delegates), in addition to 3 at-large delegates, both also according to the statewide result.

After town caucuses on April 21, 2020 designated delegates for the state convention, the state convention was held on May 30, 2020 to nominate national convention district delegates, who in turn elected the 3 at-large and 2 pledged PLEO delegates for the Democratic National Convention at the national convention delegate meeting on June 13, 2020. The delegation also included 8 unpledged PLEO delegates: 4 members of the Democratic National Committee, 3 members from Congress (both senators, including formally Independent Bernie Sanders, and representative Peter Welch), and former DNC chair Howard Dean.

Candidates
The following people have filed and qualified to be on the ballot in Vermont.

Running

Joe Biden
Michael Bloomberg
Tulsi Gabbard
Mark Greenstein
Bernie Sanders
Elizabeth Warren

Withdrawn

Pete Buttigieg
Julian Castro
Amy Klobuchar
Deval Patrick
Tom Steyer
Marianne Williamson
Andrew Yang

The name of early presidential candidate Michael Bennet, who had already dropped out of the race, was written in by three voters.

Polling

Results

Results by county

See also
 2020 Vermont Republican presidential primary

Notes

References

External links
The Green Papers delegate allocation summary
Vermont Democratic Party draft delegate selection plan

Vermont Democratic
Democratic primary
2020